Delfí Abella i Gibert (February 2, 1925 – February 1, 2007) was a Catalan psychiatrist, essayist and songwriter.

A medical psychiatrist by profession, he was head of the Department of Psychiatry at the Hospital de Santa Creu i Sant Pau,  professor of psychiatry at the Universitat Autònoma de Barcelona, and author of works on psychiatry.

In 1961, Abella became one of the earliest members of the Nova Cançó group Els Setze Jutges. He released three EPs as a member of the group, recording twelve songs in total. Abella's Catalan-language adaptations of songs by French chanson singers including Barbara, Anne Sylvestre, and Guy Béart were performed and recorded by some of the younger members of the Els Setze Jutges: Maria del Mar Bonet, Guillermina Motta, Maria Amèlia Pedrerol, and Joan Manuel Serrat. Els Setze Jutges received the Medal of Honor from the Parliament of Catalonia in April 2007. Abella's widow accepted the award in his place.

Published works
 Mossèn Cinto vist del psiquiatre Anàlisi psico-patològica dels articles "en defensa pròpia", 1958
Tòtems actuals i altres assaigs (Contemporary totems and other essays). 1960
El Nostre caràcter (Our [Catalans] character), 1961
L'orientació antropològica existencial de la psiquiatria (The anthropological and existential orientation of psychiatry), 1962
Estudio clínico y fenomenológico de la hipocondría (Clinical and phenomenological study of hypochondria), 1962
Què cal saber d'higiene mental (What it is necessary to know about mental hygiene), 1963
Geni i catalanitat de Ramon Llull (Genius and Catalanism of Ramon Llull), 1964
Psiquiatria fonamental (Fundamentals of psychiatry), 1981
Trenta cançons (Thirty songs) (poetry), 1998.

Discography with Els Setze Jutges
Canta les seves cançons, 1962
Cançó del turista, 1963
Barbaritats d'avui, 1965

References

Spanish essayists
Spanish psychiatrists
1925 births
2007 deaths
20th-century essayists